Vermileo vermileo is a species of wormlion in the family Vermileonidae.

References

Insects described in 1758
Vermileonomorpha
Taxa named by Carl Linnaeus
Diptera of Europe